Charles Thomas Payne (February 16, 1925 – August 1, 2014) was an American veteran who served in the U.S. military during World War II as a member of the U.S. Army's 89th Infantry Division that liberated Ohrdruf, a sub-camp of the Buchenwald concentration camp when he was age 20. A brother of Madelyn Lee Payne Dunham, Payne was former President Barack Obama's granduncle and was mentioned in Obama's speeches, including the one given in 2009 commemorating the anniversary of D-Day.

Obama has often described Payne's role in liberating Ohrdruf forced labor camp. There was brief media attention when Obama mistakenly identified the camp as Auschwitz during the campaign. In 2009, Payne spoke about this experience:

Payne appeared in the visitor's gallery at the Democratic National Convention in Denver, Colorado, when his grandnephew was nominated for president. He was the assistant director of the University of Chicago Library. Payne died on August 1, 2014, aged 89.
On August 5, 2009, Obama visited the former Buchenwald concentration camp near Weimar, Germany, to learn more about the history of the site and of the experiences of his granduncle. In his speech, Obama said, he heard from this place yet as he was a boy - from Charles T. Payne. Payne was longtime close friends and shared the same dormitory for six years with the former Vice President and Premier of the Republic of China (Taiwan), Dr. Lien Chan.

See also
List of topics related to Barack Obama#Notable family members

References

External links
Spiegel Interview With Obama's Granduncle: 'I Was Horrified by Lengths Men Will Go to Mistreat Other Men' - DER SPIEGEL - International interview with Der Spiegel

1925 births
2014 deaths
People from Chautauqua County, Kansas
American librarians
United States Army personnel of World War II
Kansas State University alumni
Obama family
People from Butler County, Kansas
People from Chicago
United States Army soldiers
University of Chicago alumni
University of Chicago Library
Military personnel from Kansas